Nadipur is the name of Ward Number 3 in Pokhara Metropolitan City in Nepal. Seti Hydropower Station is located in this ward.

References

Wards of Pokhara